Abdallah Said Sarouma (born December 31, 1956) is a Comorian politician from Mohéli. From 26 May 2016 to 26 May 2019, he has served as the Vice President responsible for Transport, Posts and Telecommunication and Information and Communication Technology for the Comoros.

References

Comorian politicians
Living people
Vice-presidents of the Comoros
People from Mohéli
1956 births